Villa Paraíso is an American telenovela produced by Xfinity for Telemundo, which will begin airing from October 6, 2014, through Telemundo. Starring Ximena Duque and David Chocarro as the main protagonists, while Silvana Arias and Ricardo Chávez star as the main antagonists.

Production 
In late August 2014, David Chocarro shared through his Twitter account a photo with Ximena Duque, in which the new production of Telemundo confirmed. Recordings from the web-novela began at the end of the recordings on the soap opera "En otra piel", which participated in the Arias and Chocarro. 

 Created by - Alex Hadad
 Directed by - Errol Falcón
 Producer - Jose Pérez 
 Exec Producer - Alina Bérriz

Cast 
Ximena Duque as Cristina Vidal
David Chocarro as Sebastián Mejía
Silvana Arias as Silvia Arteaga
Ricardo Chávez as Ricardo Castillejo
Carlos Garin as Gustavo De Armas
Francisco Porras as Eugenio Mendoza
Vivian Ruiz

References

External links 
 

2014 telenovelas
Telemundo telenovelas
Spanish-language American telenovelas
2014 American television series debuts
2014 American television series endings